Life, Scars, Apologies is the second full-length studio album by alternative metal band Since October. The album was released on June 8, 2010, through Tooth & Nail Records, their second for the label.

Track listing

Members 

Ben Graham – lead vocals
Luke Graham – guitar, backing vocals
Josh Johnson – bass guitar, backing vocals
Audie Grantham – drums, screaming vocals

References

2010 albums
Since October albums
Tooth & Nail Records albums